Loch a' Ghobhainn is an upland freshwater loch lying inland and south west of the village of Shieldaig in the Scottish Highlands. The loch was surveyed on 8 August 1902 by T.N. Johnston and John Hewitt and later charted as part of Sir John Murray's Bathymetrical Survey of Fresh-Water Lochs of Scotland 1897-1909.

References 

Ghobhainn
Ghobhainn